Yoweragabbie is a small town in the Mid West region of Western Australia between the towns of Mount Magnet and Yalgoo.

The town originated as a railway siding on the Mullewa to Cue line in 1898 when the line was opened, which was constructed to service the surrounding pastoral stations. In 1913 land was set aside for a townsite and was gazetted in 1914. Very little development ever took place at the town.

The name of the town is Aboriginal in origin and is taken for a nearby well. The well had first been recorded on maps surveyed in 1886.

In 1896, following heavy rain, the townsite and the surrounding stations were flooded. The area was inundated again in 1926 resulting in rail services being cancelled.

A pastoral lease, Yoweragabbie Station, existed since as a lease 1880 in the area when it was owned by the Watson family. In 1926 the property had a flock of 21,800 sheep and produced a clip of 458 bales of wool. The Yoweragabbie railway siding was situated on the property which shared boundaries with Murrum, Nalbarra and Mundinia Stations.

References 

Mining towns in Western Australia
Towns in Western Australia
Shire of Mount Magnet